Château de Bellegarde may refer to:

 Château de Bellegarde (Lamonzie-Montastruc) in Dordogne
 Château de Bellegarde (Loiret) in Loiret
See also:
 Château Bellegarde in Landes